Christina Chong (born 18 September 1983) is an English actress. She has appeared in several notable roles in film and television, including Monroe, Line of Duty, Halo: Nightfall, Black Mirror, Doctor Who, and 24: Live Another Day. She plays the role of La'an Noonien-Singh in the Paramount+ original series Star Trek: Strange New Worlds (2022present).

Early life and education 
Chong was born in Enfield, the daughter of a Chinese father and an English mother. She was first raised together with her five siblings in Broxbourne. Later, after the separation of her parents, she moved with her mother and siblings to Longridge, her mother's hometown. According to her own recollection, Chong and her siblings were the only mixed-race children attending the local school. Chong started dancing at the age of four and attended the Sutcliffe School of Dance in Longridge. Aged 14, she gained a place at the Italia Conti Academy of Theatre Arts in London, graduating five years later. After graduation, she got a role in Elton John's musical Aida being performed in Berlin. An injury cut short her career in musical theatre, though, so she turned to acting, training at the Lee Strasberg Theatre and Film Institute in New York City for 18 months. After her return to London, she had initially difficulties finding work as an actor, acting only in a few small supporting roles and commercials. To support herself, she gave acting lessons at schools and held a part-ownership of her chef father's Chinese restaurant in Harpenden.

Career 
In 2011, Chong made her breakthrough with supporting roles in the movies W.E. and Johnny English Reborn and TV appearances in a Doctor Who episode, and as a regular cast member in the medical series Monroe. In the next 3 years, she appeared as either a regular or guest in a number of different English and American TV series.

In 2015, she had a recurring role in the second season of the SyFy series Dominion, as Zoe Holloway, a member of Vega’s Archangel Corps, who becomes the leader of the rebellion of the city's lower classes.

Chong was cast in a minor role in Star Wars: The Force Awakens, but was not seen in the final cut of the film.

Chong stars in a main role in the 2022 series Star Trek: Strange New Worlds as La'an Noonien-Singh, a descendant of the character Khan Noonien-Singh.

Filmography

Film

Television

References

External links
 
 Christina Chong ('Doctor Who') interview
 Interview about her roles in Doctor Who and Monroe (Red Carpet TV, 8 mins)

1983 births
Living people
People from Enfield, London
Actresses from London
People from Longridge
British film actresses
Lee Strasberg Theatre and Film Institute alumni
Alumni of the Italia Conti Academy of Theatre Arts
21st-century British actresses
British television actresses
Actresses from Lancashire
British actresses of Chinese descent
English people of Chinese descent
Actresses from Hertfordshire
People from Broxbourne
21st-century English women
21st-century English people